Kuehne Logistics University – Wissenschaftliche Hochschule für Logistik und Unternehmensführung (KLU) is a private, state-recognized business school (Wirtschaftshochschule) based in Hamburg, Germany. It was founded by the Kühne Stiftung (Kuehne Foundation), based in Schindellegi, Switzerland. The contracting body is the Kühne Logistics University gGmbH. The non-profit foundation supports education and further education as well as research and science in transport and logistics.

KLU comprises two departments: "Department of Operations and Technology" and "Department of Leadership and Management", and it spans the whole gamut of university education and executive education, from bachelor's degrees and three master's programs to the structured PhD program. KLU is located at Hamburg's HafenCity area and its classes are taught in English.

History

The Kuehne Logistics University evolved in September 2010 from Kühne School of Logistics and Management, the graduate business school for logistics management at the Technical University of Hamburg (TUHH). The Kühne School was founded in 2003 as a public–private partnership by the Technical University of Hamburg and the Kühne Foundation as Hamburg School of Logistics, but was later renamed in honor of Klaus-Michael Kühne, a German entrepreneur who donated 3 million euro for the school's foundation, followed by an additional donation of 30 million euro in 2007. In conjunction with the opening ceremony of the new campus, Klaus-Michael Kühne donated an additional 40 million euro to the KLU.

Kühne School offered a full-time and a part-time in-service M.B.A. program with a logistics management specialization, and two master's programs, one in Logistics, Infrastructure, and Mobility and the other in International Industrial Engineering.

 2003 founding of Hamburg School of Logistics (HSL)
 2004 MBA-degree program – full-time
 2005 Accreditation of full-time MBA Programs by ASIIN
 2006 MBA-degree program – part-time
 2006 First Summer School – part-time
2007 renaming and change of legal status to Kühne School of Logistics and Management at the TUHH
 2007 Master-degree program International Engineering and Management – full-time
 2008 Accreditation of the part-time MBA-Programs by ASIIN
 2008 Master-degree program logistics, Infrastructure and mobility – full-time
 2010 founding and state recognition of the Kühne Logistics University - Wissenschaftliche Hochschule für Logistik und Unternehmensführung (KLU

Right to confer doctorates
KLU was granted the right to confer PhD degrees on September 7, 2017. The Hamburg Senate adopted the relevant resolution in a session on August 8, 2017.

Accreditation
All programs are accredited by either ASIIN or FIBAA. As a private higher education institution, KLU has been accredited by the German Council of Science and Humanities (WR, Wissenschaftsrat) which regularly assesses the quality of private education undertakings in Germany. In its decision, the Wissenschaftsrat highlighted the international education at KLU and the quality of its research output.

Programs
KLU offers international programs, which are taught exclusively in English:

Bachelor of Science (BSc) in Business Administration with four profiles: international management, sustainable management, supply chain management, and digital management & innovation. Besides the 'standard track' with 180 ECTS-credits and an integrated internship, KLU also offers an 'intensive track' with 210 ECTS-credits and two internships.
 Master of Science (MSc) in Global Logistics & Supply Chain Management
 Master of Science (MSc) in International Management 
 Master of Science in Global Logistics & Supply Chain Management (TriContinent). Students in this program study the first semester at Kühne Logistics University in Hamburg, the second semester in Shanghai, China and the third semester in Knoxville, Tennessee, US.
 Doctoral Program (PhD)
 MBA Leadership & Supply Chain Management

Study costs & scholarships 
Study costs
In January 2022:
The fees for the 2-year Master's program were €7,190.00 per semester. The fees for the 3-year Bachelor program were €6,190.00 per semester (standard track, 180 ECTS credits) and €6,890.00 per semester (intensive track, 210 ECTS credits).

Scholarships

At KLU there are several scholarship possibilities, which support and encourage students financially, e.g.:

 Deutschlandstipendium (Germany Scholarship)
 Merit-based scholarships
 Sport Scholarship: KLU is a partner university for competitive sports and is in mutual exchange with the Olympic Training Center Hamburg/Schleswig-Holstein and the General German University Sports Association (adh)
 Gifted Education Awards (Begabtenförderungswerke)

Rankings

 U-MULTIRANK: KLU RANKS TOP IN INTERNATIONAL ORIENTATION
 KLU TOPS THE CHARTS IN ALL CATEGORIES OF CHE UNIVERSITY RANKING 2020/21
 KLU RANKED FAVORITE UNIVERSITY IN GERMANY
 GLOBAL STUDENT SATISFACTION AWARD 2019
 WIRTSCHAFTSWOCHE RANKING 2019
 CHE UNIVERSITY RANKING 2017
 UNIVERSITY AWARD 2017
 HANDELSBLATT RANKING 2014
 FIBAA PREMIUM SEAL

Erasmus
In July 2012, KLU was awarded the Erasmus University Charter. Through this European Union program, partnership agreements between European universities are facilitated, students can receive EU funding for stays abroad (language courses, semesters and internships abroad), and the mobility of teachers and university staff across Europe is also supported.

Partner universities 
KLU maintains more than 50 partnerships with universities worldwide, within the framework of which an exchange of students from the Faculty of Economics takes place. Among the partner universities are:

 USA: Fisher College of Business at Ohio State University, Quinnipiac University, Haslam College of Business at University of Tennessee 
 Singapore: National University of Singapore
 Austria: Vienna University of Economics and Business, Vienna, Universität Klagenfurt
 France: EM Strasbourg Business School, Strasbourg, Audencia Business School, Nantes
 Italy: University of Trieste, Trieste
 Greece: The American College of Greece (DEERE), Athens
 Belgium: KU Leuven, Hogeschool, Brussels
 Iceland: Reykjavík University
 Sweden: Chalmers University of Technology, Gothenburg
 Colombia: Universidad de los Andes , Bogotá
 India: S.P. Jain Institute of Management & Research, Mumbai
 Mexico: Universidad Panamericana, Mexico City
 Uruguay: Universidad de Montevideo, Montevideo
 Chile: Universidad Técnica Federico Santa María, Valparaíso
 Netherlands: Erasmus University Rotterdam  Center for Maritime Economics and Logistics (MEL), Rotterdam
 Russia: Higher School of Economics, Moscow
 Turkey: Koç-Universität, Istanbul
 South Africa: Universiteit Stellenbosch, Stellenbosch
 China: Chinesisch-Deutsches Hochschulkolleg (CDHK), Tongji-Universität, Shanghai, University of Nottingham Ningbo China, Zhejiang
 Thailand: Thammasat Business School, Bangkok

References

External links
 Website of Kühne Logistics University.

Business schools in Germany
Educational institutions established in 2003
Educational institutions established in 2010
Universities and colleges in Hamburg
Buildings and structures in Hamburg-Mitte
2003 establishments in Germany
2010 establishments in Germany